Cai Jianming (born 1 August 1963) is a Chinese sprinter. He competed in the men's 100 metres at the 1988 Summer Olympics.

References

1963 births
Living people
Athletes (track and field) at the 1988 Summer Olympics
Chinese male sprinters
Olympic athletes of China
Place of birth missing (living people)
Asian Games medalists in athletics (track and field)
Asian Games gold medalists for China
Athletes (track and field) at the 1986 Asian Games
Athletes (track and field) at the 1990 Asian Games
Medalists at the 1986 Asian Games
Medalists at the 1990 Asian Games